
This is a list of postal codes in Canada where the first letter is A. Postal codes beginning with A are located within the Canadian province of Newfoundland and Labrador. Only the first three characters are listed, corresponding to the Forward Sortation Area.

Canada Post provides a free postal code look-up tool on its website, via its mobile apps for such smartphones as the iPhone and BlackBerry,  and sells hard-copy directories and CD-ROMs. Many vendors also sell validation tools, which allow customers to properly match addresses and postal codes. Hard-copy directories can also be consulted in all post offices, and some libraries.

Newfoundland and Labrador - 35 FSAs
Notes: As of May 2007, no postal codes yet begin with A3*, A4*, A6* or A7*.

Urban

Rural

References

Postal codes
A
Postal codes A